Stephen Michael Bagarus (September 19, 1919 – October 17, 1981) was an American football running back in the National Football League for the Washington Redskins and the Los Angeles Rams.  He played college football at the University of Notre Dame.

References

1919 births
1981 deaths
Players of American football from South Bend, Indiana
American football running backs
Notre Dame Fighting Irish football players
Washington Redskins players
Los Angeles Rams players
Wilmington Clippers players